Ulf Lyfors (9 July 1943 – 20 February 2022) was a Swedish football player and coach.

Career
Lyfors played for Huvudsta IS.

Lyfors managed Djurgården's women's team in the 1979 and 1980 seasons. From 1980 to 1987, he was the coach of the Sweden women's national team, in that time winning the UEFA Women's Championship once, in 1984.

Lyfors can be seen in the 2013 Sveriges Television documentary television series The Other Sport.

Personal life
Lyfors was married to coach and former player Marika Domanski-Lyfors and has one child.

References

1943 births
2022 deaths
Swedish football managers
Sweden women's national football team managers
Djurgårdens IF Fotboll (women) managers
UEFA Women's Championship-winning managers
Swedish footballers